Myeloconis guyanensis is a species of corticolous (bark-dwelling), crustose lichen in the family Trichotheliaceae. Found in the coastal lowlands of eastern Guyana, it was formally described as a new species in 1996 by Patrick M. McCarthy and John Elix.

References

Gyalectales
Lichen species
Lichens described in 1996
Lichens of Guyana
Taxa named by John Alan Elix